Electrification of Saint Petersburg Railway Division. Direct lines from Saint Petersburg Finlyandsky–Vyborg and Saint Petersburg Finlyandsky–Beloostrov through Sestroretsk continued to work with steam haulage after the Russian Revolution up to World War II.

First project
In 1930, the first project for electrification of a railroad line of seashore–Beloostrov rings was developed. But the state boundary was in the urban-type settlement Beloostrov, and the authorities did not improve the transport accessibility area. They rightly believed that the availability of suburban passenger electric trains would increase the number of summer residents in direction of traffic.

Implementation
Without waiting for the end of the war, the chief of department of electrification of the October Railway Kirillov made an application for electrification of the seashore–Beloostrov rings and directions to station Terioki addressed to the Leningrad city town committee VKP managing transport department. After the war, the state border was pushed to a distance of more than 100 kilometers (over Vyborg) and the electrification program was not hampered.

Documents
Documents were issued on the basis of which the electrification of the Leningrad – Zelenogorsk line was authorized:
 Decision of the Council of Ministers of the USSR No. 858-316, dated 4 March 1950;
 The order of the Minister of Communications Beschev B. P. No. 176/Ц dated 17 May 1950;
 The final draft prepared by the Institute Lengiprotrans, engineers Keltuyala and Mazursky.

Timeline of electrification
Finlyandsky Rail Terminal–Zelenogorsk – 1951
Zelenogorsk–Ushkovo – 1952
Ushkovo–Roshchino – 1954
Roshchino–Kirillovskoye – 1968
Kirillovskoye–Vyborg – 1969
Vyborg–Luzhayka – 1977
International connection – 1978

Picture gallery

See also
 History of rail transport in Russia
 Miller's line
 Rail transport in the Soviet Union
 Railway electrification in the Soviet Union
 Riihimäki – Saint Petersburg Railway

References 

 
Railway lines in Russia